The 2014 Scottish Cup Final was the 129th final of the Scottish Cup, the most prestigious knockout football competition in Scotland. The match took place at Celtic Park on 17 May 2014 and was contested by St Johnstone and Dundee United.

After winning the game 2–0, St Johnstone entered the 2014–15 UEFA Europa League in the Second Qualifying Round.	

This was St Johnstone's first-ever Scottish Cup Final in their 130-year history, and Dundee United's 10th.

Route to the final

St Johnstone

St Johnstone entered the competition in the Fourth Round. They began their campaign against Livingston at McDiarmid Park. Stevie May and Sanel Jahić scored the goals that sealed the Saints' passage into the next round. St Johnstone then took on Forfar Athletic in Forfar, winning 4–0, courtesy of goals from May, Frazer Wright, Michael O'Halloran and James Dunne.

In the quarter-final St Johnstone were drawn away again, against Raith Rovers. Goals from Gary McDonald, Nigel Hasselbaink and Steven Anderson sealed a 3–1 victory. 

In the semi-final at Ibrox on 13 April, St Johnstone faced Aberdeen. A double from May ended Saints semi-final hoodoo and sent St Johnstone to their first-ever Scottish Cup final.

Dundee United

Dundee United entered the competition in the Fourth Round. They began their campaign against Kilmarnock at Tannadice. Andrew Robertson scored twice, with goals from Stuart Armstrong, Brian Graham and Gary Mackay-Steven sealing the Terrors' passage into the next round. Dundee United then took on St Mirren. United won 2–1, courtesy of goals from Ryan Gauld and Nadir Çiftçi.

In the quarter-final Dundee United were drawn against Inverness CT. Çiftçi scored twice, with goals from Gavin Gunning, Mackay-Steven and Armstrong sealing a 5–0 victory. In the semi final at Ibrox on 12 April, Dundee United faced Rangers. Goals from Armstrong, Mackay-Steven and Çiftçi sent Dundee United to the final for the first time since 2010.

Pre-match
This was St Johnstone's first appearance in the Scottish Cup Final, while it was Dundee United's tenth appearance. United had previously won two Scottish Cups (in 1994 and 2010), and have been beaten in seven finals. The most notable meeting of the two clubs in the Scottish Cup until now was in the 1990–91 Scottish Cup, when Dundee United won 2–1 in a semi-final at East End Park and advanced to the 1991 Scottish Cup Final.

For the first time in its history, the Scottish Cup Final was played on a Sunday in 2013. This was done to comply with UEFA regulations which prohibit televised matches being played on the same day as the UEFA Champions League Final. As the 2014 UEFA Champions League Final was being played on a different weekend, this meant that the Scottish Cup Final could again be played on a Saturday.

The redevelopment of Hampden Park for use as the main athletics stadium in the 2014 Commonwealth Games meant that the traditional home of the Scottish Cup Final was not available. As with the 2014 Scottish League Cup Final, the Scottish Football Association opted to use Celtic Park instead. 26,000 tickets were sold on the first full day of sales. St Johnstone received an initial allocation of 11,300 tickets, but almost all of these were sold after the first day of public sale. Dundee United had sold about 16,000 tickets before commencing their public sale of tickets. A JustGiving appeal to fund tickets for poorer fans raised over £14,000 within 12 hours of it being launched.

A day before the final Dundee United announced they had broken their own record of ticket sales for a final by selling over 28,000 tickets. St Johnstone, meanwhile, sold over 15,000 tickets.

The match was shown live on BBC Scotland and on Sky Sports.

Match details

{| style="width:100%; font-size:90%;"
|
Man of the Match: Steven Anderson (St Johnstone)

|}Match officialsReferee:
 Craig Thomson
Assistant referees:
 Graham Chambers
 Michael Banks
Additional assistant referees:
 Kevin Clancy
 Alan Muir
Fourth official: 
 Stephen FinnieMatch rules'''
 90 minutes
 30 minutes of extra time if necessary
 Penalty shoot-out if scores still level
 Seven named substitutes
 Maximum of three substitutions

References

See also
 Tayside derby

2014
1
Dundee United F.C. matches
St Johnstone F.C. matches
2010s in Glasgow
May 2014 sports events in the United Kingdom